As Velhas Conquistas or "the Old Conquests" are a grouping of the areas in Goa which were incorporated into Portuguese India early in the sixteenth century AD; as these areas underwent urbanisation they were elevated to concelhos (municipalities) by the Portuguese Viceroyalty that ruled from the administrative centre at Velha Goa. Having been acquired in AD 1510 or within the next few years, they formed the oldest parts and the core of Portuguese Goa and remain as the central theme in the history geography and culture of present-day Goa and Damaon. The Novas Conquistas or New Conquests formed the outer periphery of Goa bordering the erstwhile British India. Novas Conquistas of present-day Goa shares borders with the Konkan province of Maharashtra, and also with Belgaum and North Canara districts of Carnatica.

The three concelhos of the territory are Bardes (Bardez), Ilhas de Goa (Tiswadi), and Salcette  (modern-day Salcete and Mormugao talukas). When writing postal addresses, Velhas Conquistas is abbreviated to "V.C."

Technically and historically the enclaves of Damaon and Diu Island which were settled by the Portuguese in 1523 AD are also part of the Old Conquests, however in layman's terms and contemporary contexts Velhas Conquistas is taken to mean the westernmost and central portions of Goa, particularly the environs and neighbouring towns of the centuries-old city and capital of Ponnje. The Old Conquests are also the most socio-economically developed areas of Goa.

See also
Novas Conquistas

Colonial Goa
Districts of Goa
Former districts of India